Antti Nikkilä (born 25 August 1978) is a Finnish retired basketball player. He stands 2.10 m (6' 11") tall and weighs 122 kg (270 lb).

He played college basketball at Valparaiso University (Valparaiso, Indiana, U.S.) from 1999–2003, and in the season 2006-2007 played for ČEZ Basketball Nymburk in the Czech basketball league. In June 2007 he was signed by Dinamo Banco di Sardegna Sassari (Italian Legadue basketball league). He also played for ARIS BC

Awards
Korisliiga Rookie of the Year: 1997–98
Greek Cup Winner: (2004)

References

External links
Antti Nikkila Valparaiso Crusaders Game Log (2001-02)
Antti Nikkila Valparaiso Crusaders Game Log (2002-03)

1978 births
Living people
Aris B.C. players
BCM Gravelines players
CB Girona players
Basketball Nymburk players
Dinamo Sassari players
Ionikos N.F. B.C. players
Finnish expatriate basketball people in Spain
Finnish expatriate basketball people in the United States
Finnish expatriate basketball people in the Czech Republic
Finnish expatriate basketball people in Greece
Finnish men's basketball players
Tampereen Pyrintö players
Valparaiso Beacons men's basketball players
Centers (basketball)
Sportspeople from Tampere
Finnish expatriate basketball people in Germany